The Junior National Football Championship, also known as BC Roy Trophy, is an Indian football tournament held for players under 19 years of age. The competition is held every year between the teams representing state associations of India under the AIFF. The tournament was instituted by the AIFF in 1962, with the Indian Football Association presenting the trophy in the memory of former West Bengal Chief Minister Bidhan Chandra Roy.

Results
The following is the list of winners and runners-up:

See also
Elite League
Reliance Foundation Development League
Football in India
Indian football league system
State football leagues in India

References

External links

Football cup competitions in India
Youth football in India
Youth football competitions